Wonderful World of Animation is a nighttime show at Disney's Hollywood Studios. The show is a celebration of all Disney animation (including Pixar), beginning with Mickey Mouse. It premiered on May 1, 2019, as part of the park's 30th anniversary celebration, replacing Disney Movie Magic.

It was originally set to close on May 13, 2020; however, it closed early on March 16, 2020, due to the COVID-19 outbreak, and was replaced by an updated version of Disney Movie Magic.

On July 21, 2021, following Walt Disney World's reopening, Disney's Hollywood Studios announced that an updated version of the show would return on August 1, 2021, in time for Walt Disney World's 50th Anniversary celebration.

Summary
The show kicks off with a tribute to the beginning of Disney animation, Mickey Mouse, followed by segments highlighting a number of animated feature films, including Snow White and the Seven Dwarfs, Sleeping Beauty, The Little Mermaid, Beauty and the Beast, Aladdin, Lilo & Stitch, Finding Nemo, The Incredibles, Frozen, Big Hero 6, Zootopia, Cars 3, Coco and Ralph Breaks the Internet. There is also a Disney Villains segment, highlighted by Tamatoa, Hades, and Yzma.

Show scenes
 Opening
 Mickey's Gala Premiere
 Magic
"The Sorcerer's Apprentice" (Fantasia)
 "Friend Like Me" (Aladdin)
 "Let It Go" (Frozen)
 Brother Bear
 Pinocchio
 Sleeping Beauty
 Cinderella
 The Princess and the Frog
 The Sword in the Stone
 Tangled
 Family
 "The World Es Mi Familia" (Coco)
 "Hawaiian Roller Coaster Ride" (Lilo & Stitch)
 "Beyond the Sea" (Finding Nemo/Finding Dory)
 Sleeping Beauty
 Pocahontas
 Brave
 The Princess and the Frog
 Tarzan
 The Rescuers
 Frozen
 Bambi
 Dumbo
 Hercules
 One Hundred and One Dalmatians
 Pinocchio
 Moana
 Zootopia
 Tangled
 Peter Pan
 Inside Out
 Lady and the Tramp
 The Little Mermaid
 Mulan
 Big Hero 6
 The Good Dinosaur
 The Lion King
 Meet the Robinsons
 Action
 "The Glory Days" (The Incredibles/Incredibles 2)
 "Try Everything" (Zootopia)
 "Life is a Highway" (Cars/Cars 2/Cars 3)
 Coco
 Peter Pan
 Aladdin
 Up
 Hercules
 The Many Adventures of Winnie the Pooh
 The Princess and the Frog
 Big Hero 6
 Mulan
 Robin Hood
 The Emperor's New Groove
 Tarzan
 Toy Story
 Pinocchio
 The Great Mouse Detective
 Snow White and the Seven Dwarfs
 Finding Nemo
 Beauty and the Beast
 Toy Story 2
 Ralph Breaks the Internet
 Alice in Wonderland
 Bolt
 The Black Cauldron
 Tangled
 Frozen
 Sleeping Beauty
 The Little Mermaid
 Brave
 The Lion King
 Pocahontas
 Treasure Planet
 Love
 "Once Upon a Dream" (Sleeping Beauty)
 "Kiss the Girl" (The Little Mermaid)
 "Beauty and the Beast" (Beauty and the Beast)
 Bambi
 Monsters, Inc.
 Lady and the Tramp
 The Princess and the Frog
 The Rescuers Down Under
 Hercules
 Toy Story 3
 Cinderella
 Frozen
 Tarzan
 WALL-E
 Wreck-It Ralph
 The Lion King
 Up
 Snow White and the Seven Dwarfs
 One Hundred and One Dalmatians
 Aladdin
 Tangled
 Villains
 "Shiny" (Moana)
 "The Gospel Truth" (Hercules)
 "Perfect World" (The Emperor's New Groove)
 The Sword in the Stone
 The Princess and the Frog
 Inside Out
 Toy Story 2
 The Jungle Book
 Finding Nemo
 Toy Story 3
 Cinderella
 Tangled
 Monsters University
 Robin Hood
 Meet the Robinsons
 Beauty and the Beast
 Coco
 One Hundred and One Dalmatians
 The Incredibles
 Alice in Wonderland
 Zootopia
 Aladdin
 Frozen
 Peter Pan
 Lady and the Tramp
 Friendship
 "When Can I See You Again?" (Wreck-It Ralph/Ralph Breaks the Internet)
 "The Silly Song" (Snow White and the Seven Dwarfs)
 "Immortals" (Big Hero 6)
 Aladdin
 Toy Story 2
 Oliver & Company
 Atlantis: The Lost Empire
 Zootopia
 The Jungle Book
 The Fox and the Hound
 The Good Dinosaur
 Moana
 Monsters, Inc.
 Hercules
 The Little Mermaid
 Mulan
 Up
 The Many Adventures of Winnie the Pooh
 Toy Story 3
 Tarzan
 Inside Out
 Beauty and the Beast
 Peter Pan
 Back to the Past
 Strange World
 Lightyear
 Turning Red
 Encanto
 Luca
 Raya and the Last Dragon
 Soul
 Onward
 Frozen II
 Toy Story 4
 Ralph Breaks the Internet
 Incredibles 2
 Coco
 Cars 3
 Moana
 Finding Dory
 Zootopia
 The Good Dinosaur
 Inside Out
 Big Hero 6
 Frozen
 Monsters University
 Wreck-It Ralph
 Brave
 Winnie the Pooh
 Cars 2
 Tangled
 Toy Story 3
 The Princess and the Frog
 Up
 Bolt
 WALL-E
 Ratatouille
 Meet the Robinsons
 Cars
 Chicken Little
 The Incredibles
 Home on the Range
 Brother Bear
 Finding Nemo
 Treasure Planet
 Lilo & Stitch
 Monsters, Inc.
 Atlantis: The Lost Empire
 The Emperor's New Groove
 Dinosaur
 Fantasia 2000
 Toy Story 2
 Tarzan
 A Bug's Life
 Mulan
 Hercules
 The Hunchback of Notre Dame
 Toy Story
 Pocahontas
 The Lion King
 Aladdin
 Beauty and the Beast
 The Rescuers Down Under
 The Little Mermaid
 Oliver & Company
 The Great Mouse Detective
 The Black Cauldron
 The Fox and the Hound
 The Rescuers
 The Many Adventures of Winnie the Pooh
 Robin Hood
 The Aristocats
 The Jungle Book
 The Sword in the Stone
 One Hundred and One Dalmatians
 Sleeping Beauty
 Lady and the Tramp
 Peter Pan
 Alice in Wonderland
 Cinderella
 The Adventures of Ichabod and Mr. Toad
 Melody Time
 Fun and Fancy Free
 Make Mine Music
 The Three Caballeros
 Saludos Amigos
 Bambi
 Dumbo
 Fantasia
 Pinocchio
 Snow White and the Seven Dwarfs
 It All Started with a Mouse
 Steamboat Willie
 Mickey Mouse

References

External links
 Official site

Disney's Hollywood Studios
Amusement rides introduced in 2019
Amusement rides that closed in 2020
Amusement rides introduced in 2021
Walt Disney Parks and Resorts entertainment
Walt Disney Parks and Resorts fireworks
2019 establishments in Florida
Fireworks events